Prosper Independent School District (PISD or Prosper ISD) is a public school district based in Prosper, Texas, United States. Located in Collin County, a portion of the district extends into Denton County.

The district enrollment was 14,287 as of the 2018-2019 school year.  The student body of Prosper High School (as of the 2019-2020 school year) consists of 1,229 freshmen, 1,078 sophomores, 983 juniors, and 804 seniors. The high school enrollment is approximately 4,094 as of the 2019-2020 school year.  

The town of Prosper continues to experience large population growth, and PISD expects to add new schools as the need arises. The land for Rock Hill High School (opened in 2020) is signed off of the west side of Coit Road in north Frisco, south of U.S. 380. There are also signs for future high schools on the south side of Parvin Road (between Dallas Parkway and County Road 1381), the south side of East First Street (between Coit Road and Custer Road), and the north side of County Road 123 (between Custer Road and Lake Forest Drive in northwest McKinney). PISD has planned to have 6-8 comprehensive 5A high schools at build-out. 

The district continues to add extra schools as population growth increases the demands. For the 2022-23 school year, Prosper ISD opened a new school, Joyce Hall Elementary. 

In 2011, the school district was rated "Recognized" by the Texas Education Agency.

Prosper ISD has its own police department separate from the Town of Prosper Police. This is because PISD covers areas and has schools in six municipalities (Prosper, Texas; Celina, Texas; Frisco, Texas; McKinney, Texas; Collin County; and Denton County). A Prosper police officer would only have jurisdiction in the town of Prosper, while a PISD officer can cover any school in any area of Prosper ISD.

Demographics

Schools
High Schools (Grades 9-12)
Prosper High School (Opened Fall 2009) (Prosper)
Rock Hill High School  (Opened Fall 2020) (Frisco)
Walnut Grove High School (Opening Fall 2023) (Prosper)
Middle Schools (Grades 6-8)
Lorene Rogers Middle School (Opened Fall 2008) (Prosper)
Reynolds Middle School (Opened Fall 2010) (Prosper)
Bill Hays Middle School (Opened Fall 2019) (Frisco)
William Rushing Middle School (Opened Fall 2020) (Prosper)
Daniel L. Jones Middle School (Opening Fall 2024) (Frisco)
Elementary Schools (PK-5)
John Baker Elementary School (McKinney)
Ralph & Mary Lynn Boyer Elementary School (Celina)
Mrs. Jerry Bryant Elementary School (Prosper)
Dan Christie Elementary School (Celina)
Judy Cockrell Elementary School (Prosper)
R. Steve Folsom Elementary School (Prosper)
Furr Elementary School (McKinney)
Joyce Hall Elementary (Prosper)
John & Betty Hughes Elementary School (McKinney)
Sam Johnson Elementary School (Celina)
Light Farms Elementary School (Celina)
Lilyana Elementary School (Celina)
Reeves Elementary School (McKinney)
Judy Rucker Elementary School (Prosper)
John Spradley Elementary School (Frisco)
Chuck and Cindy Stuber Elementary School (Prosper)
Windsong Ranch Elementary School (Prosper)
Other Campuses
DAEP
Former Schools
Prosper Elementary School (Now Rucker)
Prosper Middle School (Closed Summer 2008)

History 
In the 1990s, PISD had 2 campus: Prosper Elementary (grades PK-5) and another campus housing Prosper Middle and High Schools (grades 6-12) 

In the early 2000s, a new Prosper High School was built, followed by 2 new elementary schools. Along the way, Prosper Elementary was renamed Rucker Elementary. 

In 2007, Prosper Middle School hosted 7th and 8th graders in its final year. 

In 2008, Rogers Middle School opened, replacing Prosper Middle School. The PMS campus was renovated into PISD's Administration Building. 

In 2009, Prosper High School moved into its new $120 million dollar campus, which was the most expensive high school ever built in Texas.

In 2010, the former PHS building opened after a year of renovations as Reynolds Middle school, housing 7th and 8th graders. With this change, Rogers Middle School housed only 5th and 6th graders.

In 2012, Cockrell Elementary was opened.

In 2015, Light Farms Elementary was opened.

In 2016, Hughes and Windsong Elementary schools opened, which allowed the district to move from PK-4 elementary campuses to grades PK-5. With this transition, both middle schools now host grades 6-8.

In 2018, the University Interscholastic League classified PISD's first high school as 6A.

In 2019, Children's Health Stadium opened as a 12,000 seat stadium for Prosper ISD football games. With this addition, Prosper High School played home games at Children's Health Stadium, moving away from the relatively tiny Eagle Stadium near Reynolds Middle School. Children's Health Hospital paid $2.5 million dollars for the naming rights to the stadium. 

The same year, Hays Middle School opened, becoming the first school in Prosper ISD with an animal other than an Eagle as their mascot or with school colors other than green and white. Hays uses the Hawk as their mascot and uses the primary school color blue. Rock Hill High School, into which Hays feeds, used the Blue Hawks as the school's mascot and blue as the primary school color when it opened in 2020.

In 2020, Rock Hill High School opened, meaning PISD had more than one high school for the first time in district history. Rock Hill High School was built for roughly $200 million dollars, making it the most expensive high school ever built in Texas. That fall, Prosper also opened Johnson Elementary School, named after Representative Sam Johnson, and Rushing Middle School, named after former superintendent William Rushing.

Criticism 

In September 2015, Greg Wright created controversy for the school and the Prosper School District as reported in the Dallas Morning News when he was caught criticizing a teacher that reported another teacher from PHS to the Police for inappropriately touching a student.

In 2018, two editorials were removed from Prosper High School's student newspaper. John Burdett, the principal of the school, claimed that it put the school in an incorrectly assessed negative position. The students claimed that they would be censored if they tried to criticize the school.

References

External links
 

School districts in Collin County, Texas
School districts in Denton County, Texas